Canadian Shores is an unincorporated community and census-designated place (CDP) in Pittsburg County, Oklahoma, United States. It was first listed as a CDP prior to the 2020 census.

The CDP is in northern Pittsburg County, on the south side of the Canadian River and the inundation zone of Eufaula Lake. It is on the north side of Oklahoma State Highway 113, which leads west  to Indianola and east  to Canadian.

Demographics

References 

Census-designated places in Pittsburg County, Oklahoma
Census-designated places in Oklahoma